William James Heard (born 26 April 1991) is an English singer–songwriter. In August 2013, he was featured on Klangkarussell's single "Sonnentanz (Sun Don't Shine)" which had peaked at number three on the UK Singles Chart and number eighteen in the Republic of Ireland. In January 2014, he was featured on Australian DJ house group The Aston Shuffle's single "Tear It Down" and had worked with them on their single "Comfortable" previously. Heard has had an active music career since 2011, performing residencies as a singer-songwriter.

Music career

2013–2016: Breakthrough
He was featured on Klangkarussell's single "Sonnentanz (Sun Don't Shine)" which was released in the United Kingdom on 18 August 2013. On 21 August 2013, the song was at number two on the Official Chart Update in the UK. On 22 August 2013, the song entered the Irish Singles Chart at number 77, peaking at number 23. On 25 August 2013, the song entered the UK Singles Chart at number three and the UK Dance Chart at number two. Heard has been working with MTA Records signee Elli Ingram, providing saxophone and backing vocals.

2017–present: Trust EP 
On 17 February 2017, Heard released his debut EP Trust. It was preceded by the lead single "Beep Me" which premiered on 1 February. It was written by Melvin Barcliff, Tim Mosley and Melissa Elliott. A music video for the opening track "I Better Love You" was premiered on 8 March on his Vevo YouTube channel.

Discography

EPs

Singles

Solo

As featured artist

Guest appearances

References

External links
 Will Heard on Facebook
 Official Will Heard website

1991 births
Living people
21st-century saxophonists
21st-century English singers
21st-century British guitarists
21st-century British male singers
Bisexual musicians
Bisexual men
British male saxophonists
English pop singers
English pop guitarists
English male singer-songwriters
English jazz singers
English soul singers
English jazz guitarists
English male guitarists
English jazz saxophonists
English soul musicians
British LGBT singers
British male jazz musicians
Musicians from London
20th-century LGBT people
21st-century LGBT people